Out of Time is the sequel to Caroline B. Cooney's young adult novel Both Sides of Time, and is the second book in the Time Travelers Quartet.

Plot Overview
Annie Lockwood is going on a school field trip to New York City one year after she has returned to her time in 1995 after meeting Strat.  While in New York, she slips back one hundred years into the past, to discover her one true love, Strat, has been put into an insane asylum.  Annie learn from Strat's younger sister Devonny that Strat's current predicament is because he continued to insist that Annie was real, even though she mysteriously disappeared and everyone else decided to forget her existence. Annie decides to save Strat and prove that she is real and could travel through time. Annie also learns that Strat's betrothed, his childhood friend Harriet, is suffering from consumption.

Annie disguises herself as Devonny and manages to get past obstacles that were in the way, especially Walker Walkley, Strat's former best friend and now antagonist of the book. The two reunite and narrowly escape Walkley, who plans to take over the Stratton fortune. Annie has second thoughts about Strat being with Harriet when she died, mainly because she knew Harriet loved Strat and was betrothed to him and Strat adored her. Strat later explains to Annie that she must go back to her own time and he must stay, no matter how much they love each other. Strat says he would go to Mexico, along with his friends at the insane asylum.

, one of Harriet's close friends and who loved Harriet, noticed Annie getting kidnapped by Walkley, so he shoots him. Annie is then whisked back to her proper time soon afterwards.

See also
 Both Sides of Time
 Prisoner of Time
 For All Time

1996 American novels
American romance novels
American young adult novels
Novels about time travel
Novels set in New York City
Fiction set in 1896
Sequel novels